Chana Joffe-Walt is a radio journalist and producer. She has worked for Planet Money and This American Life.

Early life
Joffe-Walt's parents, Brian Walt https://www.mvtimes.com/2016/06/29/west-tisbury-15/ and unknown other parent(s), are South African. She graduated from Oberlin College in 2003.

Career
Joffe-Walt began her radio career volunteering for a community radio station outside Seattle, KBCS. She was later a reporter for the Seattle radio station KPLU and a freelancer for NPR before being recruited to work for Planet Money. She then became a producer for This American Life.

In 2020, the New York Times published Nice White Parents, a five-part podcast reported by Joffe-Walt.

Awards
In 2016, Joffe-Walt, along with Nikole Hannah-Jones and Ira Glass, won a Peabody Award for an episode of This American Life on school segregation and education.

References

External links
This American Life Radio Archive by Contributor - Chana Joffe-Walt
Planet Money Blog post

American radio producers
American women journalists
Living people
Year of birth missing (living people)
21st-century American journalists
American people of South African descent
Oberlin College alumni
21st-century American women
Women radio producers